Nuno Rocha may refer to two footballers.

 Nuno Miguel Teixeira Rocha, Portuguese footballer
 Nuno Miguel Monteiro Rocha, Cape Verdean footballer